Racalmuto (from the Arabic  raḥl mawt, "village of death" or  raḥl Ḥammūd, "Hammoud's village") is a comune (municipality) in the Province of Agrigento in the Italian Autonomous Region of Sicily, located about  southeast of Palermo and about  northeast of Agrigento.

Racalmuto is the setting of Angelo F. Coniglio's historical fiction novella The Lady of the Wheel.

Racalmuto borders the following municipalities: Bompensiere, Canicattì, Castrofilippo, Favara, Grotte, Milena, Montedoro.

Notable people 
Racalmuto was the birthplace and lifelong home of author Leonardo Sciascia (1921–89)

Bibliography
 Leonardo Sciascia: Wine Dark Sea, 2001
 Angelo F. Coniglio: The Lady of the Wheel, 2012

Twin towns
 Hamilton, Ontario, Canada
Murray St. in Hamilton's Little Italy is known as Corso Racalmuto, after the Racalmutesi immigrants who populated the area
 Finale Ligure, Italy

References

External links
 Official website

Cities and towns in Sicily